Charged is the second full-length album by American stoner rock band Nebula. It was released in 2001 and was the band's last album on Sub Pop records before switching to Liquor and Poker. The album was remastered and reissued in 2019 by the band's current label, Heavy Psych Sounds Records.

This is the last album featuring former Fu Manchu bandmate Mark Abshire on bass. The third track "Giant" was featured in the skateboarding video game Tony Hawk's Pro Skater 4. The Japanese release on Sweet Nothing Records contains the bonus tracks "Humbucker" (from the "Clearlight" single) and "Cosmic Egg" (from the "Do It Now" single).

Track listing 
All songs written by Eddie Glass.
 "Do It Now" – 4:03
 "Beyond" – 3:38
 "Giant" – 3:55
 "Travelin' Man's Blues" – 5:41
 "Instant Gravitation" – 3:37
 "This One" – 3:42
 "Ignition" – 4:34
 "Shaker" – 3:27
 "Goodbye Yesterday" – 4:38
 "All the Way" – 9:25
Two hidden tracks "Humbucker" and "Cosmic Egg" are found only on the Japanese version

Critical reception 

Reception for the album was positive. However, the positive reviews were granted for contradictory changes in genre/style. AllMusic complimented their increased acoustic complexity, alongside improved "trippy background effects". NME congratulated their increase in raw power and a summary of "an album that takes the glib stoner rock soundbite and forces strong acid on its tongue". Conversely, Exclaim! felt the band were "putting their more unhinged and progressive leanings to the side," and opted for a more cohesive set of stoner groove and rock.

Personnel 
Eddie Glass – guitar, vocals, keyboards
Ruben Romano – drums, vocals, keyboards
Mark Abshire – bass, vocals

Produced by Nebula and John Agnello

Credits
Recorded October 2000 at Water Music, Hoboken, NJ

Engineered by John Agnello

Assistant Engineering by Rudyard Lee Cullers

Additional Recording by Geoff Sanoff

"All The Way" was Mixed at Water Music

Mixed by John Agnello & Nebula

November 2000 at Dangerous Music, NYC

Assistant Engineering by Charles Martinez

Mastered by John Golden

Editing by J.J. Golden

All Songs 2001 Volcanic Pineapple (ASCAP)

Music by Eddie Glass

Words by Nebula

Band Photos by Jenny Mcgee

Cover Photo by Ruben, Graficized by Mark

Cover Concept: Nebula, Assembly by Mark

References 

2001 albums
Nebula (band) albums
Sub Pop albums